Nephilinae is a spider subfamily of the family Araneidae with seven genera. The various genera in Nephilinae were formerly grouped in the family Nephilidae, and before that in the Tetragnathidae and in the Araneidae (where they have been restored). All nephiline genera partially renew their webs. Spiders in the subfamily Nephilinae are commonly referred to as golden orb-weavers.

Reproductive behavior
The genera Herennia, Nephilengys and Nephilingis display extreme sexually driven selection.  The pedipalps of these genera have become highly derived by evolving enlarged, complex palpal bulbs which break off inside the females' copulatory openings after copulation. The broken palps serve as mating plugs, which makes future matings with a mated female more difficult. These genera of spiders also participate in mate guarding; a mated male will stand guard by his female and chase off other males, thereby increasing the mated male's paternity share. Mated males are castrated in the process of mate plugging, though this may be an advantage in mate guarding, as mated males have been observed to fight more aggressively and win more frequently than virgin males. So while the female spiders are still at least potentially polygamous, the males have become monogamous.

Taxonomy

Up to the late 1980s, following Eugène Simon in 1894, Nephila and its close relatives were considered to make up the subfamily Nephilinae of the family Araneidae. In 1986, Herbert Walter Levi suggested that Nephila and Nephilengys belonged in the family Tetragnathidae, based on the structure of the male palp. Cladistic studies in the 1990s appeared to confirm the relationship between nephilines and Tetragnathidae. Further studies refuted this proposal, but did not resolve the relationship with araneids. In 2006, Matjaž Kuntner removed the group from Araneidae and raised the subfamily Nephilinae to the family Nephilidae. However, molecular phylogenetic studies from 2004 onwards consistently placed nephilids within Araneidae. Accordingly, in 2016, Dimitar Dimitrov et al. returned the group to their traditional position as a subfamily of Araneidae. The World Spider Catalog does not recognize subfamilies, but agrees in placing all the genera in the family Araneidae.

Phylogeny
A 2013 molecular phylogenetic study suggested the genera of Nephilinae were related as shown in the cladogram below. It was this study that supported the split between Nephilengys and Nephilingis.

Although Nephila appears not to be monophyletic, the authors of the study did not suggest splitting the genus. The phylogeny suggests that male enforced monogamy, via plugging of the female copulatory ducts by males leaving behind their palpal bulbs, is ancestral to the nephilines, and was lost in Nephila and Clitaetra.

Genera
The following genera are placed in the subfamily by Kuntner et al. (2019); distributions based on the World Spider Catalog:
 Clitaetra Simon, 1889 – Africa, Madagascar, Sri Lanka
 Herennia Thorell, 1877 – South Asia, Australia
 Indoetra (previously a subgenus of Clitaetra) Kuntner, 2006 – Sri Lanka
 Nephila Leach, 1815 – pantropical
 Nephilengys L. Koch, 1872 – South Asia to north Australia
 Nephilingis Kuntner, 2013 – tropical South America and Africa
 Trichonephila (previously a subgenus of Nephila) Dahl, 1911 – pantropical

Distribution
The subfamily has a pan-tropical distribution: species of Nephilia, in particular, are found in tropical and subtropical environments in the Americas, Africa, Asia, and Australia.

See also

 Spider families

References

Further reading
 
 
 Nephila of Southern Africa

External links

 

Araneidae
Spider subfamilies